Prince Aleksander Danilovich Menshikov (tr. ;  – ) was a Russian statesman, whose official titles included Generalissimo, Prince of the Russian Empire and Duke of Izhora (Duke of Ingria), Prince of the Holy Roman Empire, Duke of Cosel. A highly appreciated associate and friend of Tsar Peter the Great, he was the de facto ruler of Russia from 1725 to 1727.

Early life

Historian Paul Bushkovitch argues that Menshikov was not an aristocrat and was most likely descended from servants of the palace stables, who among others made up the first soldiers of Peter's 'toy armies.' As the legend (dating from around 1710) goes, he was making a living on the streets of Moscow as a vendor of stuffed buns known as pirozhki at the age of twenty. His fine appearance and witty character caught the attention of Franz Lefort, Peter's first favourite, who took him into his service and finally transferred him to the tsar. On the death of Lefort in 1699, Menshikov succeeded him as Peter's prime favourite and confidant. 

He took an active part in the Azov campaigns (1695–1696) against the Ottoman Empire. During the tsar's first foreign tour in the next year, Menshikov worked by his side in the dockyard of Amsterdam, and acquired a thorough knowledge of shipbuilding and colloquial Dutch and German. He acted as subordinate to Boris Sheremetev, who was commander-in-chief during the retreat before Charles XII in 1708, subsequently participating in the battle of Holowczyn, the reduction of Mazepa, and the crowning victory of Poltava, where he won his field-marshal's baton.

Corruption
Around 1706 he had a conflict with Andrew Vinius; Vinius lost all of his land and goods. From 1709 to 1714 he served during the Courland, Holstein and Pomeranian campaigns, but then, as governor-general of Ingria, with almost unlimited powers, was entrusted with a leading part in the civil administration. Menshikov understood perfectly the principles on which Peter's reforms were conducted and was the right hand of the tsar in all his gigantic undertakings. But he abused his powerful position, and his corrupt practices frequently brought him to the verge of ruin. Every time the tsar returned to Russia he received fresh accusations of plunder against "his Serene Highness."

Peter's first serious outburst of indignation (March 1711) was due to the prince's looting in Poland. On his return to Russia in 1712, Peter discovered that Menshikov had turned a blind eye to wholesale corruption in his own governor-generalship. Peter warned him "for the last time" to change his ways. Yet, in 1713, he was implicated in the "Solovey process", in the course of which it was demonstrated that he had defrauded the government of 100,000 roubles. He only owed his life on this occasion to a sudden illness. On his recovery Peter's fondness for his friend overcame his sense of justice. In 1714 he was elected a Fellow of the Royal Society.

In the last year of Peter's reign new allegations of fraud by Menshikov came to light, and he was obliged to appeal for protection to the empress Catherine. It was chiefly through the efforts of Menshikov and his colleague Tolstoi that, on the death of Peter, in 1725, Catherine was raised to the throne. Menshikov was committed to the Petrine system, and he recognised that, if that system were to continue, Catherine was, at that particular time, the only possible candidate. Her name was a watchword for the progressive faction. The placing of her on the throne meant a final victory over ancient prejudices, a vindication of the new ideas of progress, and not least security for Menshikov and his ill-gotten fortune.

Supremacy and disgrace

During Catherine's short reign (February 1725May 1727), Menshikov was practically the absolute ruler of Russia. He promoted himself to the unprecedented rank of Generalissimo, and was the only Russian to bear a princedom title. Upon finishing the construction of the Menshikov Palace on the Neva Embankment in St Petersburg (now assigned to the Hermitage Museum), Menshikov intended to make Oranienbaum a capital of his ephemeral Principality. Pushkin in one of his poems alluded to Menshikov as "half-tsar".

On the whole he ruled well, his difficult position serving as some restraint upon his natural inclinations. He contrived to prolong his power after Catherine's death by means of a forged will and a coup d'état. While his colleague Peter Tolstoi would have raised Elizabeth Petrovna to the throne, Menshikov set up the youthful Peter II, son of the tsarevich Alexei, with himself as dictator during the prince's minority.

He now aimed at establishing himself definitely by marrying his daughter Mary to Peter II. But the old nobility, represented by the Dolgorukovs and the Galitzines, united to overthrow him, and he was deprived of all his dignities and offices and expelled from the capital. His wife Darya Mikhailovna (born Arseneva) died on their way into exile in 1728 near Kazan.

According to Simon Sebag Montefiore in his book The Romanovs 1613–1918 Menshikov was once punched twice by Tsar Peter the Great, once in the nose and once on the side of the head, after Tsar Peter saw Menshikov dancing with his sword still on, which is considered to be highly rude and offensive.

Menshikov built a wooden church in Beryozovo. He buried his daughter who died in exile there. Menshikov's younger children survived the exile and were eventually returned to the court.

Palaces

Children

Princess Maria Alexandrovna (26 December 17111729) engaged to Grand Duke Peter of Russia and died of smallpox in exile.
Princess Alexandra Alexandrovna (17 December 171213 September 1736) married Gustav von Biron, brother of Ernst Johann von Biron, and died in childbirth.
Prince Alexander Alexandrovich, Duke of Ingria (March 171427 November 1764) engaged to Grand Duchess Natalia Alexeyevna but eventually married Princess Yelizaveta Petrovna Golitsyna and had issue.

See also

Alexander Sergeyevich Menshikov – his great grandson.

References

External links
The Menshikov Palace in St Petersburg
Virtual excursion in the Menshikov Palace 

1673 births
1729 deaths
Politicians from Moscow
Tsardom of Russia people
Generalissimos
Fellows of the Royal Society
Alexander Danilovich
Russian military personnel of the Great Northern War
Battle of Poltava
Princes of the Holy Roman Empire
Members of the Supreme Privy Council
Recipients of the Order of the White Eagle (Poland)
Russian royal favourites